Bernard Amadei (born July 23, 1954) is a professor of civil engineering at the University of Colorado Boulder, founding president of Engineers Without Borders (USA), co-founder of the Engineers Without Borders-International Network, and founding director of the Mortenson Center in Engineering for Developing Communities. He is also a recipient of multiple awards and distinctions (see below) and holds seven honorary doctoral degrees.

In 2009, he was recognized with an Award of Excellence from Engineering News-Record. In 2012, Dr. Amadei was appointed as a Science Envoy to Pakistan and Nepal by the U.S. Department of State.

Education
Amadei is a native of Roubaix, France, born on July 23, 1954. Amadei earned a Diploma of Engineer (Dipl. Eng.) in 1977 in the area of Applied Geology from the School of Applied Geology and Mining Engineering (Ecole Supérieure de Géologie Appliquée et de Prospection Minière) in Nancy, France (currently known as the École nationale supérieure de géologie or ENSG). Following a year of service in the French Army (August 1977 to August 1978), he began graduate studies abroad. He earned a Master of Science from the University of Toronto in 1979 and was awarded a doctorate (PhD) in civil engineering in 1982 from the University of California, Berkeley for his thesis publication entitled "The Influence of Rock Anisotropy on Measurement of Stresses in Rock in situ." The Obama administration, following up the president's announcement of the program in Cairo, named Dr. Amadei one of three Scientific Envoys appointed by Secretary of State Clinton in November, 2012.

Establishment of Engineers Without Borders-USA
A firm belief in the principle that engineers must hold the public welfare paramount, or above any other responsibility, led Amadei to reconsider his involvement in a hydroelectric plant in Costa Rica in 2002. He thought that this project would displace too many local residents and violate this principle of "do no harm." This realization came along about two years after his first experience with a humanitarian engineering project.

In 2000, Amadei organized an effort resulting in the construction of a water pump for a village in Belize. He undertook the effort at the suggestion of an immigrant landscaper working at his residence. Amadei saw that the installation of a pump to supply drinking water to the village of San Pablo would have a social impact on this community. Young girls in the village were tasked with carrying water each day from the river to the village. This meant that they could not attend school. Using the engineering talent of himself and his students to bring clean drinking water to the village had a huge social benefit to the community. This comprehension of the larger meaning of engineering inspired Amadei to create a volunteer organization that could enable engineers to donate their services in this manner.

From a small beginning with just a few students volunteering alongside him, the Engineers Without Borders-USA organization has grown to 15,900 members in 400 chapters. Humanitarian aid has been provided in 48 countries, benefiting more than 600,000 people.

Awards and distinctions
 1984 Rocha Medal from the International Society for Rock Mechanics - an award issued annually for an outstanding doctoral thesis in the field of rock mechanics.
 2007 Hoover Medal.
 The 13th Annual Heinz Award in the Environment, 2007
 2008, Elected member of the National Academy of Engineering (United States) for "the creation of Engineers Without Borders, leadership in sustainable development education, and research on geomechanics."
 2009 Award of Excellence from Engineering News-Record for founding Engineers Without Borders (USA).
 2009 Elected Distinguished Member of the American Society of Civil Engineers,
 2013 Elected member of the National Academy of Construction (United States)
 2011 Elected Senior Ashoka Fellow
 2015 Washington Award, The Western Society of Engineers
 2015 American Society of Civil Engineers, Outstanding Projects and Leaders (OPAL) (education)
 2016 C. H. Dunn Award of the Construction Industry Institute
 2016 Distinguished Professor, University of Colorado
 Holds seven honorary doctoral degrees (UMass Lowell; Carroll College; Clarkson, Drexel, Worcester Polytechnic Institute, Technion (Israel), SUNY-ESF)

List of works

References

External links
Membership page, National Academy of Engineering.
Profile, "Engineering for Developing Communities" website.

 Engineers Without Borders - USA
Engineers Without Borders - International
Mortenson Center in Global Engineering & Resilience

1954 births
Living people
University of Colorado Boulder faculty
UC Berkeley College of Engineering alumni
University of Toronto alumni
Geotechnical engineers
Members of the United States National Academy of Engineering
People from Roubaix
20th-century French engineers
21st-century American engineers
Ashoka Fellows